Leonardo Patti (born ) is a former Argentine male volleyball player. He was part of the Argentina men's national volleyball team. He competed with the national team at the 2004 Summer Olympics in Athens, Greece. He played with Club Ciudad de Bolívar in 2004.

Clubs
   Club Ciudad de Bolívar (2004)

See also
 Argentina at the 2004 Summer Olympics

References

1978 births
Living people
Argentine men's volleyball players
Place of birth missing (living people)
Volleyball players at the 2000 Summer Olympics
Volleyball players at the 2004 Summer Olympics
Olympic volleyball players of Argentina